Suel Andrews Sheldon (December 6, 1850 – October 28, 1926) was a member of the Michigan Senate.

Biography
Suel Andrews Sheldon was born in the Town of Hustisford, Wisconsin. In 1879, he married Eleanor Gear.

Career
Sheldon was a member of the Senate from 1899 to 1900 and again from 1905 to 1906. In 1912, he ran for the United States House of Representatives from Michigan's 5th congressional district, losing to Carl E. Mapes.

Sheldon later operated several farms to the west of Grand Rapids, Michigan. He died at Butterworth Hospital in that city on October 28, 1926.

References

1850 births
1926 deaths
People from Hustisford, Wisconsin
Republican Party Michigan state senators
19th-century American politicians
20th-century American politicians